In Greek mythology, Mygdon (Ancient Greek: Μύγδων) was the son of Ares and muse Calliope. He had three brothers named Edonus, Odomantus and Biston and was the father of Crusis and Grastus. He is considered the eponymous hero of the Thracian tribe Mygdones and founder of the Mygdonia region in ancient Macedon.

References
 Nicholas Geoffrey Lemprière Hammond and Guy Thompson Griffith. A History of Macedonia: 550-336 B.C. (Volume 2). Clarendon Press, 1979, p. 36, .

Children of Ares
Demigods in classical mythology
Ancient Mygdonia
Thraco-Macedonian mythology